Bishop Ambrose Kelly C.S.Sp (born 24 June 1900, died 12 February 1952) was a member of the Holy Ghost Fathers, and served as Archbishop of Freetown and Bo, in Sierre Leone.

Born in 1900 in Newhaven, Sussex, England, to Irish parents, Kelly was educated in Ireland, at Blackrock College, Dublin and trained to be a Holy Ghost priest, at Kimmage Manor, St. Marys, Rathmines and Blackrock, while studying in University College Dublin, graduating in 1922.
At Blackrock he excelled at sports, captaining the Cricket team, and playing out-half in the Senior Cup Rugby Team. He also gained an inter-provincial cap. He played fly half, for Blackrocks, past-pupils rugby team, while prefect there. Two of his contemporaries also became bishops, John Joseph McCarthy, and Eugene Joseph Butler. Two of Kelly's brothers, Jim and Patrick, were also educated at Blackrock, and both became priests.

Kelly was ordained a priest in 1928. He worked as a teacher in  St. Edward's Secondary School, Freetown, Sierre Leone.

In 1937 he was appointed Vicar Apostolic to Sierre Leone, and Titular Bishop of Altava and ordained bishop in Blackrock College. In 1950 Dr. Kelly was appointed to the Bishopric of Freetown and Bo when the Vicarate was elevated to a Diocese, its first Bishop.

Bishop Kelly opened the Catholic Teachers Training College in Bo,  and the General and Maternity Clinic in Serabu.

After developing health problems in 1951, Bishop Kelly died on 12 February 1952 in Sierre Leone. Initially buried in the Kissy Road cemetery, his remains were later exhumed in 1987 and re-buried in the Sacred Heart Cathedral.

References

1900 births
1952 deaths
20th-century Roman Catholic bishops in Sierra Leone
Roman Catholic missionaries in Sierra Leone
Roman Catholic archbishops of Freetown and Bo
Irish expatriate Catholic bishops
Holy Ghost Fathers
Irish Spiritans
People educated at Blackrock College
Alumni of University College Dublin